Paphos Archaeological Park (also Kato Pafos Archaeological Park) contains the major part of the important ancient Greek and Roman city and is located in Paphos, southwest Cyprus. The park, still under excavation, is within the Nea Pafos ("New Paphos") section of the coastal city.

Its sites and monuments date from prehistoric times through the Middle Ages. Among the most significant remains so far discovered are four large and elaborate Roman villas: the House of Dionysos, the House of Aion, the House of Theseus and the House of Orpheus, all with superb preserved mosaic floors, especially an Orpheus mosaic. In addition, excavations have uncovered an agora, asklipieion, basilica, odeion, and Hellenistic-Roman theatre, and a necropolis known as the "Tombs of the Kings".

Nea Paphos is one of the three components forming the Paphos archaeological complex inscribed on the UNESCO World Heritage List in 1980 for its outstanding mosaics and ancient remains, as well as its historical religious importance.

History

Nea Paphos was probably built by Nicocles, the last king of Paphos, at the end of the 4th c. BC. By the beginning of the 2nd c. BC it became the capital of the island, replacing Salamis during the Hellenistic era under the Ptolemies.

Excavations

Polish excavations in Paphos 
The archaeological expedition from the Polish Centre of Mediterranean Archaeology University of Warsaw started work under the direction of Prof. Kazimierz Michałowski in June 1965. Marble statues of Asclepius and Artemis (who was worshipped in the city) were found on the sites in the south-western part of Paphos. Another discovery was a treasure of silver coins from the reigns of Philip III of Macedon and Alexander the Great. The subsequent directors of the Polish expeditions were Prof. Wiktor Andrzej Daszewski (1971–2007) and Dr. Henryk Meyza (2008–2019). Their teams gradually uncovered an enormous antique residence (120 m long and 80 m wide). It was named the Villa of Theseus because a mosaic depicting the battle between Theseus and the Minotaur had been found inside. In 1983, a large mosaic with a depiction of Aion, the god of time and eternity, was discovered in a house which became known as the House of Aion. The excavations also encompass the so-called “Hellenistic” House and the Early Roman House. Apart from archaeological research, the expedition carries out reconstruction and conservation works.

In 2011, the Paphos Agora Project was commenced by a team from the Chair of Classical Archaeology, Institute of Archeology of the Jagiellonian University, headed by Prof. Ewdoksia Papuci-Władyka. Its main objective was to search for the Hellenistic agora, which was presumably hidden under the Roman one. In 2015 began the new phase of the project, with the aim to study and reconstruct the public space of the agora as well as the infrastructure and economic activity of Paphos.

The year 2020 marks the beginning of a joint project of a scientific consortium consisting of the Jagiellonian University, the Polish Centre of Mediterranean Archaeology University of Warsaw, and the Warsaw University of Technology. The project, entitled “MA-P Maloutena and Agora in the layout of Paphos: modelling the cityscape of the Hellenistic and Roman capital of Cyprus”, is directed by Prof. Ewdoksia Papuci-Władyka.

Monuments

House of Dionysos
This exceptionally rich villa occupies 2000 sq. m of which 556 are covered with mosaic floors decorated with mythological, vintage and hunting scenes. It is named after the god Dionysos who features on several of the mosaics.

Its rooms are arranged around a central courtyard, or atrium, which functioned as the core of the house. It was built at the end of the 2nd century AD and was destroyed and abandoned after the earthquakes of the 4th century AD.

A Hellenistic pebble mosaic representing the mythical sea-monster Scylla from an earlier villa of the 3rd c. BC which was found below the Roman villa is on display in situ.

House of Aion
Although only three rooms of this large villa have been excavated by the University of Warsaw, the mosaic floor from the House of Aion is considered one of the most exceptional works of ancient Roman art, if not the only work of its kind, and certainly one of the most enigmatic and most fervently discussed by scholars. It dates from around the mid-4th century AD and is named after the god shown in the middle of the mosaic.

The main room was probably a triclinium or reception room. Two smaller rooms had excellent geometric mosaics.

The main mosaic contains 3 horizontal frames with 5 panels all surrounded by a geometric frame.

A villa wall was found collapsed into the adjacent street and has been restored.

House of Theseus

This exceptionally large villa was the residence of the Roman proconsul or governor, and was divided between rooms for official functions and those for private use. Its name derives from the beautiful mosaic of Theseus and the Minotaur found in the southeast quarter. The villa covered several insulae of the Hellenistic street plan.

It was built in the 2nd half of the 2nd c. AD over ruins of earlier houses and was occupied until the 7th c. AD.
So far only the southern half of the villa has been fully excavated.

House of Orpheus
This villa lies to the west of the House of Theseus. The mosaics of the third century AD have three mythological representations: “Orpheus and his Lyre”, “Hercules and the Lion of Nemea” and “the Amazon”, but they are currently not on view to the public.

Theatre
The theatre, located in the northeastern area of the ancient city, is dated to originally the end of the fourth century BC and has been under excavation by the University of Sydney since 1995.

Basilica

Odeon

Agora

References

External links

 Archeological Park Paphos Life
 Polish excavations in Paphos: on the PCMA website (since 1964) and on the website of the Jagiellonian University (since 2011)

Paphos
Archaeological parks
Roman Cyprus
Archaeological sites in Cyprus
World Heritage Sites in Cyprus